Eclipse is the fifth studio album by guitarist Yngwie Malmsteen, released in 1990 through Polydor Records. The album reached No. 112 on the US Billboard 200 and remained on that chart for six weeks, as well as reaching the top 50 in six other countries.

Critical reception

Steve Huey at AllMusic gave Eclipse 3.5 stars out of 5, describing it as sounding "like a holding pattern—Malmsteen turns in a competent set of neo-classical rockers that achieve radio-ready status better than much of the material on Odyssey, but there isn't anything that sounds new here."

Track listing

Personnel
Yngwie Malmsteen – guitar, guitar synthesizer, Moog Taurus, backing vocals, arrangement, producer
Göran Edman – lead vocals
Mats Olausson – keyboard, backing vocals
Michael Von Knorring – drums
Svante Henryson – bass, backing vocals

Technical
Tom Fletcher – engineering, mixing
Keith Rose – assistant engineer
Roger Hughes – assistant engineer
Bob Ludwig – mastering

Charts

Weekly charts

References

External links
Eclipse, 1990 at yngwiemalmsteen.com
In Review: Yngwie J. Malmsteen "Eclipse" at Guitar Nine Records

Yngwie Malmsteen albums
1990 albums
Polydor Records albums